Alcaeus may refer to:

 Alcaeus (bug), a genus of stink bugs or shield bugs
 Alcaeus (comic poet), a writer of ten plays of the Old Comedy
 Alcaeus (mythology), one of several figures of this name in Greek mythology
 12607 Alcaeus, a main belt asteroid
 Alcaeus of Messene, a Greek epigrammatist of the late 3rd/early 2nd century BC
 Alcaeus of Mytilene, a lyric poet of the archaic period
 Alcaeus and Philiscus (2nd-century BC), two Epicurean philosophers expelled from Rome in either 173 BC or 154 BC